The Meadows is a master planned community, located in Castle Rock, Colorado along the Rampart Range of the Rocky Mountains Front Range. Within the community, there are several schools, churches, playgrounds, ball fields, pools, restaurants and a cultural arts center.

Education
There are several schools located within The Meadows.

Elementary schools (K-6)
 Clear Sky Elementary School
 Meadow View Elementary School
 Soaring Hawk Elementary School

Middle school (7-8)
 Castle Rock Middle School

High school (9-12) 
 Castle View High School
 Colorado Early Colleges Castle Rock

Charter schools (K-8) 
 Academy Charter School
 Aspen View Academy

Other 

 Arapahoe Community College Sturm Campus

Neighborhoods
The Meadows is currently made up of thirty neighborhoods:

 Briscoe Ranch
 Feathergrass
 Fuller Bluff
 Harris Grove
 Morgans Run
 Morningview

 Patina
 Plainsong
 Suncatcher
 Sweetwood
 Watercolor
 Weathervane

 Meadow Gate
 Mountain View
 Coyote Run
 Vista Heights
 Aspen Trail
 Deer Track
 Blacktail
 Azure
 Stewart Park

 Soaring Eagle Estates
 Upland Park
 Alpine Ridge 
 Gamble Oak 
 High Prairie 
 Leafdale 

 New Haven 
 Tyler Park 
 Cyan Circle

Parks and recreation
There are many parks, open spaces, and recreational areas within The Meadows.

Trails and Open Spaces 

East Plum Creek Trail
Native Legend Open Space
Ridgeline Open Space
Watercolor Bike Jumps

Pools 

 The Grange Cultural Arts Center
 Taft House

Playgrounds and Parks 
 Bison Park
 Butterfield Crossing Park
 Paintbrush Park
 Wiggly Field Dog Park
 Green Park
 Deputy Zack S. Parrish III Memorial Park
 Suncatcher Park

References
 Mentioned in the movie “So I married an axe murderer.”

External links
The Meadows Link
Visit Castle Rock
Town of Castle Rock
Castle Rock Chamber of Commerce
Castle Rock Economic Development Council (CREDCO)

Castle Rock, Colorado
Geography of Douglas County, Colorado
Towns in Colorado
Denver metropolitan area
Buildings and structures in Douglas County, Colorado